Mesechthistatus fujisanus is a species of beetle in the family Cerambycidae. It was described by Masao Hayashi in 1957.

References

Phrissomini
Beetles described in 1957